The 1943 Cork Intermediate Hurling Championship was the 34th staging of the Cork Intermediate Hurling Championship since its establishment by the Cork County Board in 1909.

Shanballymore won the championship following a 7-09 to 3-02 defeat of Douglas in the final. This was their first ever championship title.

Results

Final

References

Cork Intermediate Hurling Championship
Cork Intermediate Hurling Championship